Daniel Witter (died 1675) was an Irish Anglican priest in the seventeenth century.

He was born in England and moved to Ireland as chaplain to the James Butler, 1st Duke of Ormonde, Lord Lieutenant of Ireland. He was Dean of Ardfert from 1661 to 1664 when he became Dean of Down. He was nominated to be the Bishop of Killaloe on 4 August 1669 and consecrated in September that year.

He died in office on 16 March 1675.

References

1675 deaths
Deans of Ardfert
Deans of Down
Anglican bishops of Killaloe
17th-century births